Denton Diablos FC is an American amateur soccer club based in Denton, Texas, which began play in the National Premier Soccer League (NPSL) in 2019. The club made it to their conference's playoffs in their 1st season of competition. Due to Covid in 2020 the entire season was cancelled, and luckily the newly formed club remained afloat. By doing so, in their 2nd season they also made it out of the Conference Playoffs for the 1st time in 2021 and made it all the way to the NPSL National Championship.

History
The Diablos were announced in September 2018 as an NPSL expansion side to play in the South Region's Lone Star Conference. 

The club was founded through a partnership between Damon Gochneaur, owner of the Deton-based Aspiro Agency, and Michael Hitchcock, owner of Playbook Management International and fellow NPSL side Fort Worth Vaqueros FC. On October 2, the team announced Edward S. Marcus High School men's soccer coach Chad Rakestraw as the team's first head coach.

In the team's first season, the club finished second in the Lone Star before falling in the conference semifinals to the Vaqueros.

In January 2020, Denton was announced as one of 14 NPSL clubs that would take part in the 2020 U.S. Open Cup., due to Covid the tournament was canceled in both 2020 and 2021. The NPSL started its season in 2020 but quickly cancelled it until further notice. 

On October 23, 2020, Denton announced Ramón Raya as their new head coach.

After the onslaught of Covid the League returned to action in 2021 and this would prove to be The Diablos most successful season to date. They finished 1st on the Lone Star Conference Table 2 points ahead of Laredo Heat finishing the regular season 8-1-1. They went on to win their Conference by beating Laredo in the final. This led to a massively successful playoff run against FC Golden State Force, Cleveland SC, that ultimately led to a Championship matchup against Tulsa Athletic where the Diablos won 5-2 in front of their home crowd in Denton. 
2022 turned out to be quite the Championship Hangover year where the team failed to make the playoffs by 1 point finishing the season 7-4-1. Due to previous cancelation of the U.S. Open Cup Denton made their first ever appearance in 2022 where they lost to a local qualifier D'Feeters Kicks Soccer Club in the 1st round. Due to their League title in 2021 the Diablos were chosen to be the NPSL representative in the 2022 Hank Steinbrecher Cup where the lost to USL League Two Flint City Bucks 2-1 in the Cup Final.

Year-by-year results

Players & staff

Ownership 

 Damon Gochneaur - Aspiro Agency
 Michael Hitchcock - Playbook Management International

Head coaches

 Chad Rakestraw (2019–2020)
 Ramón Raya (2020–2023)
 Armando Pelaez (2023-)

Honors

Domestic 

 U.S. Open Cup Appearance 2022

 Hank Steinbrecher Cup Runner Up 2022

League 

 National Premier Soccer League Champion 2021

 West Region Champion 2021

 Roja League Champion 2020, 2021

Conference 

 Lone Star Champion 2021

 Lone Star Shield 2021

 Chisolm Trail Clásico  2021, 2022

References

External links

Sports in Denton, Texas
Association football clubs established in 2018
National Premier Soccer League teams
Soccer clubs in Texas
2018 establishments in Texas